Bill Taylor (2 June 1902 – 3 April 1977) was an  Australian rules footballer who played with Geelong in the Victorian Football League (VFL).

Notes

External links 

1902 births
1977 deaths
Australian rules footballers from Victoria (Australia)
Geelong Football Club players
Golden Point Football Club players